Sirnik may refer to:

Sirník, a village in south-east Slovakia
Syrniki, cuisine
Sirnik, a slang word combining Sir and Sanik, used to display friendship